Ronald ("Ron") Owen Laird (born May 31, 1938, in Louisville, Kentucky) was a race walker from the United States, who competed for the New York Athletic Club. He represented his native country at four Olympiads. His best finish was 19th place in the men's 50 km walk at the 1960 Summer Olympics in Rome, Italy. He won the 20 km event at the 1967 Pan American Games, and finished 25th in that event in the Mexico City 1968 Summer Olympics and 20th in the Montreal 1976 Summer Olympics, but was disqualified in the 1964 Summer Olympics event in Tokyo.

References
 USATF Hall of Fame Bio
 

1938 births
Living people
American male racewalkers
Athletes (track and field) at the 1960 Summer Olympics
Athletes (track and field) at the 1963 Pan American Games
Athletes (track and field) at the 1964 Summer Olympics
Athletes (track and field) at the 1967 Pan American Games
Athletes (track and field) at the 1968 Summer Olympics
Athletes (track and field) at the 1976 Summer Olympics
Olympic track and field athletes of the United States
Sportspeople from Louisville, Kentucky
Track and field athletes from Kentucky
Pan American Games gold medalists for the United States
Pan American Games medalists in athletics (track and field)
American masters athletes
Medalists at the 1967 Pan American Games